Kalara Santhe is a 2009 Indian Kannada-language action drama film directed by Sumana Kittur. The film features Yash, Hariprriya  in the lead roles. The film revolves around a young man who is let down by the system decides to commit suicide. When the news spreads to the media and the government, he undergoes a life-changing event.

Cast 
Yash as Somu
Hariprriya as Roopa
Rangayana Raghu as the chief minister
Kishore
Shobharaj
Jai Jagadish
Sudha Belawadi
Adi Lokesh
Sudharani as an IT professional
Sumithra

Soundtrack

The soundtrack was composed by V. Manohar.

Reception 
A critic from The Times of India gave the film three and a half out of five stars writing that "A good show by director D Sumana Kittur who gives a comical twist to a political satire with lively narration and apt sequences". A critic from Deccan Herald stated that "Yash and Haripriya make a good pair on the screen. Rangayana Raghu does justice to the role. Manohar’s music is refreshing. A critic from The New Indian Express wrote "Yash has tried hard to perform well while Haripriya is charming. She has improved a lot in dialogue delivery. The scene where she tells Yash to ask the chief minister to provide 60x40 BDA site, 20 acres of agricultural land and Rs 20 lakh is a treat to watch. Kishore has played a different kind of character. Had the director and the scriptwriter taken more care to make the screenplay crisp, the film might have been at par with Aa Dinagalu".

Awards and nominations  
Karnataka State Film Awards
 Special Jury Award ... Sumana Kittur
Filmfare Awards
 Nominated - Filmfare Award for Best Actress - Kannada - Hariprriya

References

2000s Kannada-language films
Films directed by Sumana Kittur